Joanna Wiszniewicz (18 March 1947 – 31 January 2009) was a Polish academic and historian. She was affiliated with the Jewish Historical Institute and specialized in the history of the Jews in Poland. Her writing was published in such periodicals as Jewish History Quarterly, Karta, Midrasz, Gazeta Wyborcza, and ResPublica Nowa. She authored A Life Cut in Two. Stories of the March Generation and And Yet I Still Have Dreams. A Story of a Certain Loneliness. She died on 31 January 2009, aged 61.

References

Sources
  Joanna Wiszniewicz obituary

1947 births
2009 deaths
Writers from Warsaw
20th-century Polish historians
20th-century Polish Jews
Place of birth missing
Place of death missing